Massimo Rosa  (born 9 December 1995 in Alba) is an Italian cyclist who currently rides for mountain bike racing team Giant–Liv Polimedical. He is the younger brother of fellow professional cyclist Diego Rosa.

Major results
2017
 1st Mountains classification Giro della Valle d'Aosta
 3rd G.P. Palio del Recioto

References

External links

1995 births
Living people
Italian male cyclists
People from Alba, Piedmont
Sportspeople from the Province of Cuneo
Cyclists from Piedmont